Rainbow Sun Francks (born 3 December 1979) is a Canadian actor known for his role as Lt. Aiden Ford in the television show Stargate Atlantis, and his recurring roles on The Listener, The Umbrella Academy and High Fidelity.

Early life and family 
Francks was born in Toronto, Ontario, Canada. He is the son of Canadian actor and musician Don Francks and African-American dancer Lili Red Eagle, who is originally from North Richmond, California. He is an adopted honorary member of the Red Pheasant Cree Nation, a Plains Cree First Nation. He is also the younger brother of Cree Summer.

Career 
Francks was an on-air personality at MuchMusic, a Canadian music video and variety television channel. He starred in Stargate Atlantis Season 1 as US Marine Lieutenant Aiden Ford. His role was reduced to that of a recurring character for Season 2, and was written out entirely for Season 3 and 4 (he made a brief cameo in a dream sequence in season 5). He played the role of Dev Clark on The Listener. He produces a hip hop group known as The Oddities.

Filmography

Film

Television

References

External links 
 

1979 births
Living people
20th-century Canadian male actors
21st-century Canadian male actors
Black Canadian male actors
Canadian people of African-American descent
Canadian male film actors
Canadian male television actors
Canadian VJs (media personalities)
Male actors from Toronto
Much (TV channel) personalities
Musicians from Toronto